DP1 may refer to:
 British Rail DP1
 Sigma DP1
 Prostaglandin D2 receptor
 Deadpool (film), 2016 Fox Studios Marvel Comics X-Men cinematic franchise superhero film; first in a series of "Deadpool" films.